Albert Keary (1886–1962) was an English professional footballer who played for Violet, Bootle, African Royal, Liverpool Dominion, Accrington Stanley, Manchester City, and Port Vale.

Career
Keary played for Violet, Bootle, African Royal, Liverpool Dominion, and Accrington Stanley. He made his debut for Manchester City on 7 October 1911, in a 4–1 defeat to Oldham Athletic at Boundary Park. He scored his first goal in the Football League seven days later, in a 3–1 win over Bolton Wanderers at Hyde Road. He played a further six First Division games in the 1911–12 season before departing the club. He moved on to Port Vale, and made his debut for the Central League side at inside-left in a 5–0 defeat at Stalybridge Celtic on 3 September 1912. After eight goals in 24 appearances he announced his retirement at The Old Recreation Ground at the end of the 1912–13 season.

Career statistics
Source:

References

1886 births
1962 deaths
Footballers from Liverpool
English footballers
Association football forwards
Bootle F.C. (1879) players
Accrington Stanley F.C. (1891) players
Manchester City F.C. players
Port Vale F.C. players
English Football League players